The Turkish football system is divided into the following leagues.

Men

Süper Lig
Süper Lig is the highest level in the Turkish football league system and is operated by the TFF.

Other professional divisions
TFF 1. Lig, is the second highest level in the Turkish football league system and is also operated by the TFF.

The TFF 2. Lig is the third highest level in the Turkish football league system and is operated by the TFF.

The TFF 3. Lig is the fourth highest level in the Turkish football league system and is operated by the TFF.

Lower divisions
Starting at Level 5.

Promotion and relegation can occur through every league. This means a club in the Turkish Regional Amateur League may be promoted to the top flight Süper Lig. There are two stages to being promoted to the Turkish Third League. First, provinces who do not have professional clubs send a club or clubs to play. These provinces are:
2 clubs — Düzce, Edirne, Kırklareli, Nevşehir
1 club — Ağrı, Amasya, Ardahan, Bartın, Bayburt, Bingöl, Bitlis, Hakkari, Muş, Niğde, Sinop, Tunceli

The two clubs who finished first and second gain promotion. In the second stage, the rest of the amateur clubs join in and play against each other. These provinces are:
12 clubs each from Istanbul
6 clubs each from Izmir
5 clubs each from Ankara, Balıkesir, Bursa, Kocaeli, Manisa
4 clubs each from Aydın, Kütahya, Sakarya
3 clubs each from Adana, Afyon, Antalya, Denizli, Eskişehir, Hatay, Kayseri, Konya, Mersin, Tekirdağ, Trabzon, Zonguldak
2 clubs each from Bilecik, Çanakkale, Diyarbakır, Elazığ, Erzurum, Giresun, Isparta, Kahramanmaraş, Malatya, Muğla, Ordu, Rize, Samsun, Sivas, Şanlıurfa, Uşak, Van, Yalova
1 club each from Adıyaman, Aksaray, Artvin, Batman, Bolu, Burdur, Çankırı, Çorum, Erzincan, Gümüşhane, Iğdır, Karabük, Karaman, Kars, Kastamonu, Kırıkkale, Kırşehir, Kilis, Mardin, Osmaniye, Siirt, Şırnak, Tokat, Yozgat

The club who finishes first gains promotion to the Turkish TFF Third League.

See also
League system

References

 
Football league systems in Europe